The Cirque de Mafate is a caldera on Réunion Island (France; located in the Indian Ocean). It was formed from the collapse of the large shield volcano the Piton des Neiges.

The very remote and inaccessible cirque was settled in the 19th century by maroon slaves (i.e. slaves who had escaped from their masters), then later by poor white laborers. It owes its name to one maroon leader.

Geography
The cirque is entirely enclosed by mountains, especially tall cliffs, known as remparts, save for the sole river exiting, the Rivière des Galets ("river of the pebbles"). Inside the cirque, there are considerable declivities. The îlets are pieces of more-or-less flat lands, on which the hamlets are located.

The name "Mafate" comes from the Malagasy word "Mahafaty", which means lethal, an allusion to the difficulty of reaching the Cirque.

Population
The cirque has one village, La Nouvelle, and several hamlets (fr. îlet): Marla, Roche-Plate, the Îlet-aux-Orangers, Grand Place etc.

The Cirque is entirely public property, managed by the Forestry service, from which the inhabitants rent inexpensive concessions.

There is no main electrical supply. Inhabitants thus produce their own electricity using solar panels (with battery storage), and occasionally diesel generators. However, fuel for the latter must be brought by helicopter at high cost. Because of the reduced available power supply, inhabitants systematically use low-consumption (fluorescent) light bulbs.

Similarly, all inhabitants use solar water heaters. These can be supplemented by gas-powered heaters — but gas canisters must also be brought by helicopter.

Services
La Nouvelle and hamlets have grocery stores where staples can be bought. Typically, these stores also provide some limited bar and restaurant services (hot coffee and local fast food, such as samosas).

Many inhabitants have opened gîtes (dormitories, WC and showers) where hikers can stay for the night, and often dine, for a fee.

La Nouvelle and several of the hamlets have elementary schools. In 2005, the school at Marla reopened with 6 pupils after being closed for insufficient enrolment. There are neither secondary nor higher education facilities.

There are several dispensaries between which a few nurses rotate, as well as scheduled visits of a physician, but no permanent health care facilities. All emergencies have to be evacuated by helicopter. There is no Gendarmerie station.

Transportation
One peculiarity of Mafate is that there are no roads. Because of this, it is a major attraction for hikers willing to experience some unspoiled nature, while still benefiting from grocery stores and other amenities. For this reason, with the impending creation of a national park on the heights of Réunion, it seems very unlikely that roads will be ever built.

All access, including for supplies, is by foot or helicopter. There are a number of footpaths for reaching the cirque, among which:
 By the Col des Bœufs ("pass of the oxen"), from the Cirque de Salazie, leading to La Nouvelle. This way is the easiest, since there is a forestry road leading to parking lots at the pass.
 By the Col du Taïbit from the Cirque de Cilaos.
 By the Canalisation des Orangers on the heights of Saint Paul (Réunion).

References

External links

 Trail in Mafate
 island in an island 
 the map of trails in Mafate
 les gîtes : la liste des gîtes et hébergements 
 La Nouvelle

Landforms of Réunion
Volcanoes of France
Cirques of France
Calderas of Réunion